von der Ahe is a locational surname of German origin, which means a person who lived by a creek, derived from ahe, "running water", "stream". An alternative, related meaning is "from the Ahe", where there are several rivers and towns named Ahe in Germany. The name may refer to:

Charles Von der Ahe (1882–1973), American businessman, founder of Vons supermarket chain
Chris von der Ahe (1851–1913), American businessman, baseball team owner in St. Louis
Fred Vonder Ahe (1828–1905), German pioneer of Oregon
Jess von der Ahe (born 1966), American artist
Wilfred Von der Ahe (1910–1998), American businessman, son of Charles

See also 
Ahe

References 

German-language surnames